Tobias Eriksson (born 19 March 1985) is a Swedish former professional footballer.

References

External links
 
 Tobias Eriksson at Fotbolltransfers 
 
 

1985 births
Living people
People from Ljusdal Municipality
Swedish footballers
Sweden international footballers
Sweden youth international footballers
Kalmar FF players
GIF Sundsvall players
Allsvenskan players
Association football midfielders
Sportspeople from Gävleborg County